Dans Mountain State Park is a public recreation area located  south of Frostburg and to the east of the town of Lonaconing in Allegany County, Maryland. The state park occupies  on  Dans Mountain and is managed by the Maryland Department of Natural Resources.

History
Dans Mountain was named after Daniel Cresap, the son of Thomas Cresap and an early settler of Allegany County who fell from a tree on the mountain while hunting bear cubs. According to the legendary tale, Cresap's hunting companion, the Delaware Indian Nemacolin, found his unconscious body and using a horse and litter dragged him home to safety.

The state park opened in 1952 and was developed in the 1970s. The General Assembly provided over $800,000 from 1973 to 1978 for the planning and construction of the park's swimming pool and other improvements.

Activities and amenities
In addition to wildlife, mountain streams, and scenic overlooks, the park features an Olympic-sized swimming pool with bathhouse, concession stands during warm weather months, and a fishing pond that is stocked annually.

Dan's Rock
It can be accessed from Old Dan's Rock Road in Midland. There is no direct access to Dan's Rock Overlook from Dan's Mountain State Park.

References

External links
 Dan's Mountain State Park Maryland Department of Natural Resources

State parks of Maryland
State parks of the Appalachians
Parks in Allegany County, Maryland
Parks in Cumberland, MD-WV-PA
1952 establishments in Maryland
Protected areas established in 1952